Aneesh Kapil (born 3 August 1993) is an English first-class cricketer who has played for Worcestershire County Cricket Club and Surrey. A right-handed batsman and right-hand fast-medium pace bowler he made his first-class debut for Worcestershire against Sussex in August 2011.

County career
Kapil's first competitive appearance for Worcestershire came in a List A game against Yorkshire in May 2011. He scored 44 from 55 balls, ending up second top scorer for Worcestershire as they posted a disappointing 155. Kapil bowled 5 overs in the reply going for 21 in a seven wicket defeat. Kapil made his Twenty20 debut in June 2011 playing against Lancashire in an 8-run loss at Old Trafford. On 29 June 2011, Kapil played in a T20 match against Northamptonshire, Kapil claimed 3 wickets for 9 runs restricting Northamptonshire to 129 as Worcestershire won by 6 wickets. In July 2011, Kapil played in five youth one-day Internationals for England U-19. His best performances came in the second and fifth games. In the first Youth ODI Kapil starred with the ball taking 4 wickets for 36 as England won by six wickets. In the fifth ODI, Kapil scored 54 runs from 45 balls in a one-wicket loss for England. Kapil played in a first-class match against Lancashire in August 2011; he took 3 wickets and scored 31 in the match as Worcestershire lost by 98 runs.

Kapil and Worcestershire were unable to come to an agreement on a contract extension, allegedly due to unrealistic wage demands,  and Kapil left Worcestershire at the end of the 2013 season.

In April 2014 Kapil joined Surrey on a trial. He played in the second eleven championship match against Gloucestershire at Bristol and two one day second eleven trophy matches against Gloucestershire and Sussex at Bristol and Horsham respectively. He was then registered by Surrey and made his first-class debut for the County at Canterbury on 4 May against Kent. He scored his maiden first class century against New Zealand A that same year. After an impressive 2014 season he was rewarded a contract extension. He  is playing for Sussex 2nd XI as of June 2019.

References

External links
 
 Aneesh Kapil Worcestershire County Cricket Club Profile

1993 births
Living people
English people of Indian descent
English cricketers
Worcestershire cricketers
Cricketers from Wolverhampton
British sportspeople of Indian descent
British Asian cricketers
Surrey cricketers
Staffordshire cricketers
Sussex cricketers